State Route 198 (SR 198) is a relatively short, secondary north-south state highway located in West Tennessee. Although this road runs in a generally east to west direction, The Tennessee Department of Transportation   has designated this as a north to south highway.

Route description

SR 198 starts at an intersection with SR 197 in the southeast portion of Madison County. For most of its entire length it is known as the Beech Bluff Road until it nears the city limits of Jackson. It is then designated as East Chester Street until its termination. It ends in downtown at an intersection with US 70/SR 1.

Major intersections

References

198
Transportation in Madison County, Tennessee